Since the 1950s the newspaper market has been in decline in Belgium. The number of national daily newspapers in the country was 50 in 1950, whereas it was 30 in 1965. The number became 33 in 1980. There were 32 newspapers in the country in 1995. It was 23 in 2000.

Below is a partial list of newspapers published in Belgium:

Daily newspapers 

* — La Capitale, La Meuse, La Nouvelle Gazette, La Province and Nord Eclair

Other newspapers

Dutch language
Brugsch Handelsblad
Kortrijks Handelsblad

English language newspapers
New Europe, newspaper focusing on EU affairs
The Brussels Times Belgium’s leading daily online English-language news media and bi-monthly print magazine.
Politico Europe better known for its website but it also has a weekly paper edition. Politico Europe is based in Belgium, but its subject matter is EU politics and policymaking.
The Bulletin 
Flanders Today

Media groups in Belgium 

 Mediahuis
 De Persgroep
 Rossel
 Roularta

References

Bibliography

External links

 Catalog of Belgian newspapers published after 2020
 Full List of Belgium's Newspapers and Media
 Belgium Newspapers - Belgische kranten
 

Newspapers
Belgium
List